Larnaca District is one of the six districts of Cyprus. Its capital is Larnaca. It is bordered on the east by Famagusta District, on the north by Nicosia District and on the west by Limassol District.

A small part of the district was occupied by the Turkish army in 1974, and most of the occupied part is now de facto administered as part of Northern Cyprus's Lefkoşa District, with the remaining area near Pergamos being de facto administered by the Gazimağusa District.

The communities of Melouseia, Tremetousia and Arsos lie in the occupied zone, while the municipal/community areas of Athienou, Troulloi and Pergamos are partially occupied.

Located in the district are Larnaca International Airport, the island's primary airport, and the Hala Sultan Tekke and the towns of Larnaca, Aradippou, Athienou and Lefkara.

In 2011, Larnaca District had a population of 143,192, of which 59% was urban.

History

During Turkish rule, Larnaca was one of the six cazas into which the island was divided. Cazas were subdivided into nahiehs, but in the case of Larnaca there was only one, which was coterminous with the caza. 

The caza was headed by a Kaimakan. When the British took control of Cyprus in 1878, these administrative units were retained. A British officer styled a Commissioner (later District Officer) was appointed for the caza of Larnaca, while the Turkish Kaimakan was initially retained with certain of his functions.

Some northern parts of the present District were at that time included in Famagusta District, namely Arsos, Athienou, Melousia, Troulli, Tremetousia and Pergamos. At the first British Census Larnaca District (i.e. both the caza and nahieh) had a population of 20,766.  By 1891 Athienou had been moved to Nicosia District, while the other villages were later moved to Larnaca District. Athienou was united to Larnaca District in the 1920s.

Settlements
According to Statistical Codes of Municipalities, Communities and Quarters of Cyprus per the Statistical Service of Cyprus (2015), Larnaca District has 6 municipalities and 53 communities. Municipalities are written with bold.

 Agia Anna
 Agioi Vavatsinias
 Agios Theodoros
 Alaminos
 Alethriko
 Anafotia
 Anglisides
 Aplanta
 Aradippou
 Arsos
 Athienou
 Avdellero
 Choirokoitia
 Delikipos
 Dromolaxia–Meneou
 Goşşi
 Kalavasos
 Kalo Chorio
 Kato Drys
 Kato Lefkara
 Kellia
 Kiti
 Kivisili
 Klavdia
 Kofinou
 Kornos
 Lageia
 Larnaca
 Livadia
 Mari
 Maroni
 Mazotos
 Melini
 Melouseia
 Menogeia
 Mosfiloti
 Odou
 Ora
 Ormideia
 Oroklini
 Pano Lefkara
 Pergamos
 Pervolia
 Petrofani
 Psematismenos
 Psevdas
 Pyla
 Pyrga
 Skarinou
 Softades
 Tersefanou
 Tochni
 Tremetousia
 Troulloi
 Vavatsinia
 Vavla
 Xylofagou
 Xylotymbou
 Zygi

References 

 
Districts of Cyprus